Stojan Radic is an electrical engineer at the University of California, San Diego in La Jolla since 2003. He was named a Fellow of the Institute of Electrical and Electronics Engineers (IEEE) in 2016 for his contributions to optical signal processing by leveraging optical fiber non-linearities.

Radic received his Ph.D. in optics from The Institute of Optics (Rochester, NY)) in 1995. He was also a chairman at the Jacobs School at Duke University.

References 

Fellow Members of the IEEE
Serbian engineers
University of California, San Diego faculty
Engineers from California
Living people
Year of birth missing (living people)
American electrical engineers